Alastair Keyon "Alec" Campbell (29 May 1890 – 16 June 1943) was a professional cricketer and footballer who played (as a centre-half) nearly 200 games for Southampton in the first quarter of the twentieth century, before briefly becoming manager at Chesterfield.

Early life
Campbell was born at South Stoneham to Scottish parents and was educated at King Edward VI Grammar School, Southampton, where he was captain of both the football and cricket elevens. While at school he played for England at the amateur level in an international against Netherlands, the only known occasion that a schoolboy has represented his country at that level.

Career
Before embarking on his career as a footballer, Campbell played professional cricket.

Cricketer
Campbell was a right-handed batsman.  He made his first-class debut for Hampshire in the 1908 County Championship against Northamptonshire.  In the 1908 season, Campbell played in two championship matches, the second being against Gloucestershire.  Campbell made five further first-class appearances for Hampshire in the 1909 County Championship, with his final first-class appearance coming against Northamptonshire.

Footballer

Southampton
He was soon spotted by Southampton Football Club and joined them in 1908, making his professional debut in a Southern League match at Millwall on 27 February 1909, as a replacement for Bert Trueman. He "quickly emerged as one of the club's brightest-ever prospects". In September 1909 he (together with several other amateur internationals) was persuaded to join Samuel Hill-Wood's team at Glossop North End.

Wartime football
He remained at Glossop until January 1914, before returning to The Dell. He had failed to break back into the first team before the outbreak of World War I interrupted his career. During the war he guested for West Ham United as well as turning out regularly for Southampton. Although he was offered terms to join West Ham at the end of the war, he decided to stay in Southampton where he had been offered a directorship with a firm of fruit importers.

Return to Southampton
After regular football had restarted in 1919, he lost his place to George Bradburn, before regaining it in March for the remainder of the season, becoming team captain. At 6 ft 2 in he was a distinctive figure on the pitch with his "telescopic legs". According to Holley & Chalk's "Alphabet of the Saints" he was "undoubtedly one of the club's best-ever centre-halves" and led the team to many fine performances. Under manager Jimmy McIntyre Saints were admitted into Division 3 of the Football League in 1920, and just missed out on promotion in their first season, but a year later McIntyre had successfully guided Southampton into Division Two as champions of Football League Division 3 (South).

Poole Town
Campbell remained with the Saints until the end of the 1925–26 season, when, now aged 36, he joined Poole Town. Poole had just turned professional and joined the Southern League, Eastern Division. Although only placed 14th out of 17 sides in 1926–27, the season was distinguished by an excellent FA Cup run, in which Poole beat Third Division (South) side Newport County 1–0 and met Everton in the 3rd Round proper, where they were beaten 3–1 by a Dixie Dean hat-trick at Goodison Park in front of a 65,000 crowd.

Management career
In April 1927 Campbell was appointed manager at Chesterfield, remaining only until December. In his 25 games in charge, Chesterfield picked up nine victories with eleven defeats. After leaving Chesterfield he quit football entirely.

During World War II he served as an officer in the Royal Artillery, but died of pneumonia in Cosham's Queen Alexandra Hospital in June 1943. Having been cremated at Southampton Crematorium, he is commemorated on the war memorial at South Stoneham Garden of Rest.

Honours
As a player for Southampton
Football League Third Division South Champions: 1921–22

References

External links

Profile at Cricinfo

1890 births
Sportspeople from Southampton
People educated at King Edward VI School, Southampton
1943 deaths

English cricketers
Hampshire cricketers
English footballers
England amateur international footballers
Southern Football League players
Southampton F.C. players
Glossop North End A.F.C. players
West Ham United F.C. wartime guest players
English football managers
Chesterfield F.C. managers
English people of Scottish descent
Poole Town F.C. players
Association football midfielders
British Army personnel of World War II
Royal Artillery officers
Deaths from pneumonia in England